Gurfein is a surname. Notable people with the surname include:

 David Gurfein, American U.S. Marine Corps lieutenant colonel, and CEO of nonprofit organization United American Patriots
Jim Gurfein (born 1961), American tennis player
Murray Gurfein (1907–1979), American judge
Ty Gurfein (born 1989), American dancer